The Fitzpatrick-Harmon House, at 102 E. Court St. in Prestonsburg, Kentucky, was built in 1890.  It was listed on the National Register of Historic Places in 1989.

It was described in 1988 as a two-story central passage plan house with a side-gabled roof. Its main section was built around 1890 and was modified in 1904.  A two-story Colonial Revival-style portico was added in the 1950s.  It was stated that "Although somewhat altered, the house is clearly recognizeable as a product of its time and place."

The house no longer exists at that location.

References

National Register of Historic Places in Floyd County, Kentucky
Victorian architecture in Kentucky
Colonial Revival architecture in Kentucky
Houses completed in 1890
1890 establishments in Kentucky
Former buildings and structures in Kentucky
Central-passage houses
Prestonsburg, Kentucky
Houses in Floyd County, Kentucky